Chester M. "Bo" Morgan III is an American historian.

Life
He graduated from University of Southern Mississippi, with a BA and M.A. in 1974, and Memphis State University, with a Ph.D. in history in 1982.  He was director of the oral history program and assistant professor of history at the University of Southern Mississippi.

He taught at Delta State University.

He returned to the  University of Southern Mississippi in the fall of 2009 as Professor and University Historian, and is currently finishing a Centennial History of the university.

Awards
 1986 Frederick Jackson Turner Award, for Redneck Liberal

Works
 

 From Poverty to Promise: Mississippi 1917–1945, Mississippi Department of Archives and History

References

21st-century American historians
21st-century American male writers
University of Southern Mississippi alumni
University of Memphis alumni
University of Southern Mississippi faculty
Living people
Year of birth missing (living people)
American male non-fiction writers